{{DISPLAYTITLE:H2 receptor antagonist}}

H2 antagonists, sometimes referred to as H2RAs and also called H2 blockers, are a class of medications that block the action of histamine at the histamine H2 receptors of the parietal cells in the stomach. This decreases the production of stomach acid. H2 antagonists can be used in the treatment of dyspepsia, peptic ulcers and gastroesophageal reflux disease. They have been surpassed by proton pump inhibitors (PPIs); the PPI omeprazole was found to be more effective at both healing and alleviating symptoms of ulcers and reflux oesophagitis than the H2 blockers ranitidine and cimetidine.
 
H2 antagonists are a type of antihistamine, although in common use the term "antihistamine" is often reserved for H1 antagonists, which relieve allergic reactions. Like the H1 antagonists, some H2 antagonists function as inverse agonists rather than receptor antagonists, due to the constitutive activity of these receptors.

The prototypical H2 antagonist, called cimetidine, was developed by Sir James Black at Smith, Kline & French – now GlaxoSmithKline – in the mid-to-late 1960s. It was first marketed in 1976 and sold under the trade name Tagamet, which became the first blockbuster drug. The use of quantitative structure-activity relationships (QSAR) led to the development of other agents – starting with ranitidine, first sold as Zantac, which has fewer adverse effects and drug interactions and is more potent.

H2 blockers, which all end in "-tidine", are not the same as H1 receptor antagonists, which relieve allergy symptoms.

Class members

 cimetidine
 ranitidine (withdrawn in USA, suspended in EU and Australia for carcinogen contamination in manufacturing process)
 famotidine
 nizatidine
 roxatidine
 lafutidine
 lavoltidine (discontinued as carcinogen)
 niperotidine (withdrawn as causing liver damage)
 Sufotidine

History and development 
Cimetidine was the prototypical histamine H2-receptor antagonist from which later drugs were developed. Cimetidine was the culmination of a project at Smith, Kline & French (SK&F; now GlaxoSmithKline) by James W. Black, C. Robin Ganellin, and others to develop a histamine receptor antagonist that would suppress stomach acid secretion.

In 1964, it was known that histamine stimulated the secretion of stomach acid, and also that traditional antihistamines had no effect on acid production. From these facts the SK&F scientists postulated the existence of two different types of histamine receptors. They designated the one acted upon by the traditional antihistamines as H1, and the one acted upon by histamine to stimulate the secretion of stomach acid as H2.

The SK&F team used a classical design process starting from the structure of histamine. Hundreds of modified compounds were synthesised in an effort to develop a model of the then-unknown H2 receptor. The first breakthrough was Nα-guanylhistamine, a partial H2-receptor antagonist. From this lead, the receptor model was further refined, which eventually led to the development of burimamide, a specific competitive antagonist at the H2 receptor. Burimamide is 100 times more potent than Nα-guanylhistamine, proving its efficacy on the H2 receptor.

The potency of burimamide was still too low for oral administration. And efforts on further improvement of the structure, based on the structure modification in the stomach due to the acid dissociation constant of the compound, led to the development of metiamide. Metiamide was an effective agent; however, it was associated with unacceptable nephrotoxicity and agranulocytosis. It was proposed that the toxicity arose from the thiourea group, and similar guanidine analogues were investigated until the discovery of cimetidine, which would become the first clinically successful H2 antagonist.

Ranitidine (common brand name Zantac) was developed by Glaxo (also now GlaxoSmithKline), in an effort to match the success of Smith, Kline & French with cimetidine. Ranitidine was also the result of a rational drug design process utilising the by-then-fairly-refined model of the histamine H2 receptor and quantitative structure-activity relationships (QSAR). Glaxo refined the model further by replacing the imidazole-ring of cimetidine with a furan-ring with a nitrogen-containing substituent, and in doing so developed ranitidine, which was found to have a much better tolerability profile (i.e. fewer adverse drug reactions), longer-lasting action, and ten times the activity of cimetidine.

Ranitidine was introduced in 1981 and was the world's biggest-selling prescription drug by 1988. The H2-receptor antagonists have since largely been superseded by the even more effective proton pump inhibitors (PPIs), with omeprazole becoming the biggest-selling drug for many years.

Pharmacology 
The H2 antagonists are competitive antagonists of histamine at the parietal cell's H2 receptor. They suppress the normal secretion of acid by parietal cells and the meal-stimulated secretion of acid. They accomplish this by two mechanisms: Histamine released by enterochromaffin-like cells (ECL) in the stomach is blocked from binding on parietal cell H2 receptors, which stimulate acid secretion; therefore, other substances that promote acid secretion (such as gastrin and acetylcholine) have a reduced effect on parietal cells when the H2 receptors are blocked.

Clinical use 
H2-antagonists are used by clinicians in the treatment of acid-related gastrointestinal conditions, including:

 Peptic ulcer disease (PUD)
 Gastroesophageal reflux disease (GERD/GORD)
 Dyspepsia
 Prevention of stress ulcer (a specific indication of ranitidine)
 Prevention of aspiration pneumonitis during surgery. Oral H2-antagonists reduce gastric acidity and volume and have shown to reduce the frequency of aspiration pneumonitis; however, this aspiration benefit has not been shown with IV H2-antagonists.

People who suffer from infrequent heartburn may take either antacids or H2-receptor antagonists for treatment. The H2-antagonists offer several advantages over antacids, including longer duration of action (6–10 hours vs 1–2 hours for antacids), greater efficacy, and ability to be used prophylactically before meals to reduce the chance of heartburn occurring. Proton pump inhibitors, however, are the preferred treatment for erosive esophagitis since they have been shown to promote healing better than H2-antagonists.

Adverse effects 
H2 antagonists are, in general, well tolerated, except for cimetidine, wherein all of the following adverse drug reactions (ADRs) are common. Infrequent ADRs include hypotension. Rare ADRs include: headache, tiredness, dizziness, confusion, diarrhea, constipation, and rash. In addition, gynecomastia occurred in 0.1% to 0.5% of men treated for non-hypersecretory conditions with cimetidine for 1 month or longer and in about 2% of men treated for pathologic hypersecretory conditions; in even fewer men, cimetidine may also cause loss of libido, and impotence, all of which are reversible upon discontinuation.

A 31-study review found that overall risk of pneumonia is about 1 in 4 higher among H2 antagonist users.

According to a 2022 umbrella review of meta-analyses, the use of H2 receptor antagonist is associated with pneumonia, peritonitis, necrotizing enterocolitis, Clostridium difficile infection, liver cancer, gastric cancer, and hip fracture diseases.

Drug interactions 

With regard to pharmacokinetics, cimetidine in particular interferes with some of the body's mechanisms of drug metabolism and elimination through the liver cytochrome P450 (CYP) pathway. To be specific, cimetidine is an inhibitor of the P450 enzymes CYP1A2, CYP2C9, CYP2C19, CYP2D6, CYP2E1, CYP3A4. By reducing the metabolism of drugs through these enzymes, cimetidine may increase their serum concentrations to toxic levels. Many drugs are affected, including warfarin, theophylline, phenytoin, lidocaine, quinidine, propranolol, labetalol, metoprolol, methadone, tricyclic antidepressants, some benzodiazepines, dihydropyridine calcium channel blockers, sulfonylureas, metronidazole, and some recreational drugs such as ethanol and methylenedioxymethamphetamine (MDMA).

The more recently developed H2-receptor antagonists are less likely to alter CYP metabolism. Ranitidine is not as potent a CYP inhibitor as cimetidine, although it still shares several of the latter's interactions (such as with warfarin, theophylline, phenytoin, metoprolol, and midazolam). Famotidine has negligible effect on the CYP system, and appears to have no significant interactions.

References